Xenon lamp may refer to: 

 Xenon arc lamp
 Xenon flash lamp
 An incandescent light bulb filled with xenon gas to improve life span or efficiency
 A metal halide lamp that is used in automotive headlights